Nirdosh is a 2018 Indian Hindi-language thriller film directed by Pradeep Rangwani and Subroto Paul. It stars Arbaaz Khan, Manjari Fadnis, Ashmit Patel, Maheck Chahal and Mukul Dev. The film was released on 19 January 2018. Casting by Shaikh Sajid Ali

Cast
 Arbaaz Khan as Inspector Lokhande
 Manjari Fadnis as Shanaya Grover
 Ashmit Patel as Gautam Grover
 Maheck Chahal as Adah
 Mukul Dev as Rana
Salman Shaikh as Rakesh Tripathi

Soundtracks

References

External links
 

Indian thriller films
Hindi-language thriller films
2018 films
2010s Hindi-language films
2018 thriller films